Riceland Foods, Inc. is a U.S.-based, farmer-owned agricultural marketing cooperative. Founded in 1921, it is a major miller and marketer of rice.  Riceland’s headquarters are in Stuttgart, Arkansas, and it owns and operates six rice mills, including the world’s largest in Jonesboro, Arkansas. Its principal business is receiving, storing, milling, packaging, and marketing rice, grain, and byproducts. 

This farmer-owned co-op markets through wholesale and retail channels, food service, ingredients, co-products and other local and global companies. Riceland also produces significant rice bran oil and rice flour in addition to other edible cooking oils, bulk rice bran, and rice hulls.

Riceland is a major soybean and soy oil processor in the Mississippi Delta region where milling, pressing, packaging and distribution occurs. It refines soybean and other vegetable oils for food service and food manufacturing companies.  Soybean meal products are sold primarily to the poultry and catfish industries.  In addition, winter wheat and limited quantities of corn are handled depending on the needs of farmer-members. By-products that are commercially marketed include organic gardening amenities like PBH (pasteurized rice hulls) and rice hull ash which are bio-degradable and bio-renewable soil supplement replacements for perlite and vermiculite.

Riceland Foods leadership begins with an elected board of directors composed entirely of farmers.  Standing committees monitor areas of the business and report findings to the board. Special committees are appointed as needed. Twenty five Board members are elected by Riceland's members to represent the cooperative's geographic regions. These directors serve 3-year terms, with one-third of the board up for re-election each year.

Sales as of fiscal year end July 31

As of 2005, Riceland was responsible for one-third (or more) of the total U.S. rice crop. It also sells its rice and oil products through its e-commerce site, food-service distributors, and retail locations across the United States.

Riceland is a cooperative owned by 5,500 family farmer members who are also stockholders and growers.

Products and services 

Rice milling 

Riceland operates 7 rice mills. Five rice mills and two parboiling plants operate at rice milling centers at Stuttgart and Jonesboro, Arkansas.  Riceland also operates rice mills at Waldenburg, Arkansas and New Madrid, Missouri. Each year, Riceland mills and markets more than 35 percent of the total U.S. rice crop. Rice flour is produced in Jonesboro and Waldenburg and Rice bran oil is produced in Stuttgart.  Non-GMO soy flour is produced in the Stuttgart, Arkansas area.

Grain storage

Riceland is recognized as one of the nation's top 10 grain storage companies. Crops are received from farmers at harvest and stored at locations in Arkansas and Missouri. Riceland can store 112 million bushels (2.1 million metric tons) of grain which is monitored until needed at processing plants or moved into marketing channels.

Consumer products

Packaged and flavored rice products are marketed under the Riceland brand. Vegetable oil and shortening products are sold under Riceland and private-label brands. Riceland also packages rice for many private-label and store brands.

Food service products

Riceland supplies rice and oil products to restaurants, fast-food chains, cafeterias and military installations.

Ingredient rice products

Riceland's rice, rice flour and rice bran oil are used in snack foods, bakery products, cereals, crackers, baby foods, dry packaged mixes, frozen entrees, side dishes and pet foods. Riceland sells rice and rice ingredient products to food manufacturers.

Export rice products

Riceland is a direct exporter of rice products, selling to more than 70 foreign destinations. Principal markets include the Caribbean, Central America, Mexico, Canada and the Middle East. Riceland also has customers in Scandinavia, Central and South America, and Eastern Europe.

Rice feed

Feed ingredients have expanded with products supported by Riceland's research and technical center. Defatted rice bran, mill feed and hulls are sold to both the livestock and pet food industries as ingredients. Some rice hulls are burned for energy and the ash is used as an absorbent. Rice hulls are also used as a pressing aid in fruit juice extraction and as bedding in poultry houses.

Soybean meal

Riceland produces soybean meal in Stuttgart, Arkansas. Most of the soybean meal is consumed by the region's poultry and aquaculture (fish farm) industries.

Edible oils 

Riceland's edible oil refinery at Stuttgart refines crude oils extracted from soybeans and rice bran into oil and shortening products. Corn, canola, peanut and cottonseed oils are also refined and blended.

Grain merchandising

Riceland markets wheat, soybeans and rice raw grains. Wheat is exported to Mexico and Egypt. Soybeans are sold to domestic buyers. Rough rice is sold to Mexico and Central America.

Research and technology

Riceland's research and technical center, located at Stuttgart, houses separate soybean and rice research laboratories to conduct product development, product and process improvement, and customer support. Riceland's business lines are supported by on-site analytical, food applications, and regulatory compliance labs; consumer and food service test kitchens; and a pilot plant.

References

External links 

 Official website

Grain companies of the United States
Food and drink companies based in Arkansas
Stuttgart, Arkansas
Economy of the Southeastern United States
Agricultural cooperatives in the United States
Agricultural marketing cooperatives
Rice organizations
Food and drink companies established in 1921
1921 establishments in Arkansas